Erdaobaihe is a town in Antu County, Yanbian, Jilin, China. Erdaobaihe is subdivided into Hongfeng Village, Anbei Village, Changsheng Village, Tiebei Village, Toudaobaihe Village, Changbai Village, Baoma Village and Naitoushan Village. The town had a population of 4,791 in 2020. Erdaobaihe's economy is reliant on tourism as it is next to Changbai Mountain.

Unlike most other towns in China, it administers only the built up area, with the surrounding villages being administered directly by Antu County. The forest areas surrounding the town are administered by the Changbai Mountain Management Committee and by the Baihe Forestry Bureau.

References 

Antu County
Township-level divisions of Jilin